A Christmas present is a Christmas gift given in celebration of Christmas.

Christmas Present may also refer to:
 The Ghost of Christmas Present, a character in Charles Dickens' 1843 novella A Christmas Carol
 Christmas Present (film), a 1986 Italian comedy-drama film
 Christmas Present (Andy Williams album), 1974
 Christmas Present (Boney James album), 2007
 Christmas Present (The Statler Brothers album), 1985
 Merle Haggard's Christmas Present, a 1973 album by Merle Haggard
 Noel's Christmas Presents, a British television show

See also 
 Christmas Gift (disambiguation)